The Dangling Man is an EP by Crime & the City Solution, released in 1985 through Mute Records.

Track listing

Personnel 
Crime & the City Solution
Simon Bonney – vocals
Mick Harvey – drums, keyboards, cello, illustrations
Harry Howard – bass guitar
Rowland S. Howard – guitar
Production and additional personnel
Bleddyn Butcher – photography
Flood – engineering
Jutta Henglein – photography

Charts

References 

1985 EPs
Crime & the City Solution albums
Mute Records EPs